Paul Butlin (born 16 March 1976) is a British former professional boxer who competed from 2002 to 2016.

Professional career
On 11 April 2008 Butlin appeared in the Prizefighter competition on Sky Sports, beating Colin Kenna in the quarter final before losing to David Dolan in the semi-final on points.

He fought Derek Chisora on 22 May 2009 in a rematch but lost the fight on points. He then fought Johnathon Banks on 20 June, but lost the fight by KO in the seventh round.

Butlin lost to Polish heavyweight boxer Albert Sosnowski by TKO in first round on 25 September 2010.

He opened up a boxing gym called Hardknocks based in Melton Mowbray.

On 26 October 2013, Paul Butlin fought Olympic Gold Medalist Anthony Joshua at the Motorpoint Arena Sheffield, however the fight was stopped in the second round by the referee who declared Joshua the winner by TKO.

He also won the midland area title after he fought British champion Shane McPhilbin in 2015: Butlin won after McPhilbin was disqualified after punching repeatedly to the back of the head.
He retired from boxing in June 2016.

Professional boxing record

References

People from Oakham
Sportspeople from Melton Mowbray
English male boxers
Heavyweight boxers
1976 births
Living people
Prizefighter contestants
Sportspeople from Rutland

External links

 Twitter